Woods is an American folk rock band from Brooklyn, New York, formed in 2005. The band consists of Jeremy Earl (vocals, guitar), Jarvis Taveniere (various instruments, production), Aaron Neveu (drums), Chuck Van Dyck (bass), and Kyle Forester (keyboards, sax). The band's former bassist, Kevin Morby, left the band in 2013.

Woods have released 11 albums, the latest being Strange to Explain. Pitchfork Media reviewed one of their previous albums, Songs of Shame, giving the band its "Best New Music" designation and describing the sound as "a distinctive blend of spooky campfire folk, lo-fi rock, homemade tape collages, and other noisy interludes, all anchored by deceptively sturdy melodies."

Singer-guitarist and founder Jeremy Earl also runs the Brooklyn label Woodsist, for whom the band releases their work.

Early history
Prior to their initial output as Woods, founding members Jeremy Earl and Jarvis Taveniere, along with former member Christian DeRoeck, performed together in the band Meneguar, in which Taveniere sang and played guitar, and Earl played drums. Meneguar released three albums, beginning with I Was Born At Night (released on cassette in 2004 by Fuck It Tapes, on LP the following year by Magic Bullet Records, and reissued in 2006 by Troubleman Unlimited). The group released two subsequent albums, Strangers in Our House (Release the Bats Records, 2007) and The In Hour (Woodsist, 2008) prior to shifting their focus full-time to recording and performing as Woods.

Discography
Studio albums
 At Rear House (2007)
 How to Survive In + In The Woods (2007)
 Woods Family Creeps  (2008)
 Songs of Shame (2009)
 At Echo Lake (2010)
 Sun and Shade (2011)
 Bend Beyond (2012)
 With Light and with Love (2014)
 City Sun Eater in the River of Light (2016)
 Love Is Love (2017)
 Strange to Explain (2020)

Compilations
 Reflections Vol. 1 (Bumble Bee Crown King) (2020)

Singles & EPs
 "To Clean" b/w "Rain On" (Live On WVKR" (7″ Half Machine, 2009) U.K. Issue
 "Sunlit" b/w "The Dark" (7" Captured Tracks, 2009)
 "I Was Gone" - EP (12" Woodsist, 2010)
 "Find Them Empty" b/w "Be There" (7" Woodsist, 2011)
 Summer Tour 2011 Tour Split with Kurt Vile (33 RPM 7" Woodsist, 2011)
 "Cali in a Cup" b/w "Give Your Light Off" (7" Woodsist, 2012)
 "Be All Be Easy" b/w "God's Children" (7" Woodsist, 2013)
 "Tambourine Light" b/w "Tomorrow's Only Yesterday" (7" Woodsist, 2014)

Line-up
Current
 Jeremy Earl - vocals, composer, guitar, twelve-string guitar, producer, acoustic guitar, electric guitar, drums, percussion, engineer, bass guitar (2005-present)
 Jarvis Taveniere - guitar, twelve-string guitar, composer, bass, producer, engineer, mixing (2005-present)
 Aaron Neveu - drums, acoustic guitar, bass (2013-present)
 Chuck Van Dyck - bass guitar (2014-present)
 Kyle Forester - keyboards, saxophone (2016-present)

Former
 John Andrews - piano, organ, musical saw
 Kevin Morby - bass guitar (2009-2013)
 G. Lucas Crane - tapes, keyboards
 Christian DeRoeck - guitar

Gallery

References

External links

 

Musical groups established in 2005
American folk rock groups
Freak folk
Indie rock musical groups from New York (state)
Musical groups from Brooklyn
Third Man Records artists
Shrimper Records artists